"Mundo de caramelo" is a song by Mexican actress and singer, Danna Paola. It was first released as the second single from her self-titled EP in September, 2007. In its relaunch, in 2009, it was used as the central theme of the telenovela, Atrévete a Soñar, which Paola protagonized. It also appeared on the soundtrack of the telenovela.

Official versions 
 "Mundo de caramelo" (Original version)
 "Mundo de caramelo" (Atrévete a soñar version)
 "Mundo de caramelo" (Acoustic version)
 "Mundo de caramelo" (Christmas version)
 "Mundo de caramelo" (Rock version)

Awards

References

External links 
  (Original).
  (Version Atrévete a soñar).

Danna Paola songs
Universal Music Group singles
2007 songs
2008 singles
2009 singles
Spanish children's songs